The Irish League in season 1906–07 comprised 8 teams, and Linfield won the championship.

League standings

Results

References
Northern Ireland - List of final tables (RSSSF)

1906-07
Ireland
Irish